"Every Little Time" is a song by Israeli DJ Onyx featuring Gemma J of the Real McCoy. It reached No. 66 on the UK Singles Chart.

References

2004 singles
2004 songs